Jinghe County as the official romanized name, also transliterated from Uyghur as Jing County, is a county of the Xinjiang Uyghur Autonomous Region and is under the administration of the Börtala Mongol Autonomous Prefecture. According to the 2002 census, it has a population of 120,000.

Geography and climate
Jinghe has a desert climate (Köppen BWk), with a mean total of only  of precipitation per annum and great seasonal differences in temperature, with long, very cold winters, and hot, dry summers. As spring and autumn are short, winter and summer are the main seasons. Temperatures can easily fall below  in winter or rise above  in summer. With monthly percent possible sunshine ranging from 35% in December to 70% in August and September, the county receives 2,554 hours of bright sunshine annually.

Municipalities

Jinghe County includes the towns of Jinghe and Daheyanzi.

Rural townships include Mangding, Tuoli, and Todok (Tuōtuōxiāng).

Similar-level units include the Aheqi (Āhéqí Nóngchǎng) and Bajiahu Farms (Bājiāhù Nóngchǎng) and the Bingtuan Bashisantuan and Bingtuan Jiushiyituan.

Transport
Jinghe is served by China National Highway 312.  It is a railway junction for the Northern Xinjiang, Second Ürümqi-Jinghe and Jinghe-Yining-Horgos Railways.

References

County-level divisions of Xinjiang